The 2006 Supersport World Championship was the eighth FIM Supersport World Championship season—the tenth taking into account the two held under the name of Supersport World Series. The season started on 25 February at Losail and finished on 8 October at Magny-Cours after 12 races.

The riders' championship was won by Sébastien Charpentier with a total of 6 race wins. It was Charpentier's 2nd World Supersport Championship. The manufacturers' championship was won by Honda.

Race calendar and results

Championship standings

Riders' standings

Manufacturers' standings

Participants

References

Supersport
Supersport World Championship seasons
World
World
World